USA-234, also known as NRO Launch 25 or NROL-25, is an American reconnaissance satellite, operated by the National Reconnaissance Office. Launched from Vandenberg Air Force Base in 2012, it has been identified as the second radar imaging satellite to be launched as part of the Future Imagery Architecture programme.

USA-234 was launched by United Launch Alliance, using a Delta IV carrier rocket, making its first flight in the Medium+(5,2) configuration. The rocket was launched from Space Launch Complex 6 at Vandenberg, at 23:12:57 UTC (16:12:57 PDT) on 3 April 2012. It was identified as NRO Launch 25, and was the nineteenth flight of a Delta IV; the vehicle was designated Delta 359, and named Electra.

The satellite's orbit and mission are officially classified; however, it has been located by amateur observers in a  orbit, inclined at 123 degrees.

References

Spacecraft launched in 2012
National Reconnaissance Office satellites
USA satellites
Space synthetic aperture radar
Spacecraft launched by Delta IV rockets